Second Grace: The Music of Nick Drake is a 2007 release of piano instrumentals by Christopher O'Riley, host of NPR's From The Top, of songs by English singer-songwriter Nick Drake (1948-1974).  The booklet includes a lengthy and fairly technical discussion and appreciation of Nick's music by O'Riley.

Track listing

 "Rider on the Wheel"
 "Pink Moon"
 "Fly"
 "Parasite"
 "River Man"
 "One of These Things First"
 "Joey"
 "Introduction-Bryter Layter"
 "Northern Sky"
 "Hanging on a Star"
 "Harvest Breed"
 "Place to Be"
 "Three Hours"
 "From the Morning"

References 

2007 albums
Nick Drake tribute albums
Instrumental albums